Undeceived is the second LP and third studio release by Norwegian Christian metal band Extol. It was released in 2000 on Solid State Records and re-released in 2002 on Century Media; all releases of the album other than the Solid State version switch the two opening tracks, such that "Undeceived" is the first track on the album.

Reception

In 2010, HM magazine placed Undeceived at No. 96 on its Top 100 Christian Rock Albums of All Time list stating that "Burial introduced us to these Nordic Viking metallers, but  kicked it up even another notch." Heaven's Metal fanzine ranked it No. 5 on its Top 100 Christian metal albums of all-time list.

Track listing

Personnel
Extol
 Peter Espevoll – lead vocals
 Ole Børud – guitar, clean vocals
 Christer Espevoll – guitar, backing vocals
 Tor Magne Glidje – bass guitar
 David Husvik – drums, backing vocals

Additional musicians
 Tarjei Nysted – violins on "Undeceived", "Inferno", and "Ember"; brass on "Undeceived"
 Ida Mo – cello on "Undeceived"

Production
 Producers – Extol, Ole Børud

References

2000 albums
Extol albums
Century Media Records albums
Solid State Records albums